The Tapanti climbing salamander (Bolitoglossa epimela) is a species of salamander in the family Plethodontidae, the salamander is endemic to Costa Rica. Its natural habitats are subtropical or tropical, moist lowland forests and subtropical or tropical, moist montane forests. Currently the species is under threat due to habitat loss.

References

Bolitoglossa
Endemic fauna of Costa Rica
Taxonomy articles created by Polbot
Amphibians described in 1963